Gerald Gillion (born October 10, 1985) is an American men's basketball coach. He is currently the head coach of Chicago State.

Gillion attended Florida State University. He graduated with a degree in social science in 2008.

Gillion began his coaching career when he was named head coach of Northeast High School in Oakland Park, Florida in 2008. In his first season, he led the team to 20 wins and a district title, despite winning 10 games the season before. In 2013, Gillion was hired as the director of basketball operations at FIU. He joined the staff of Orlando Antigua as a special assistant to the head coach at South Florida in 2014. He joined the staff at Tennessee Tech in 2017, and helped the team achieve a 19–12 record in his first season. Gillion took a break from coaching during the 2019–20 academic year and taught at Northeast High School. During the 2020–21 season, he was an assistant coach at Samford.

Gillion was hired as head coach of Chicago State on July 19, 2021. CSU Director of Intercollegiate Athletics Elliott Charles called Gillion "a tremendously talented recruiter and mentor to students."

His brother Kenny is the head coach at West Oaks Academy.

Head coaching record

References

External links
Chicago State Cougars bio

1985 births
Living people
American men's basketball coaches
Basketball coaches from Florida
Chicago State Cougars men's basketball coaches
College men's basketball head coaches in the United States
Florida State University alumni
High school basketball coaches in Florida
Samford Bulldogs men's basketball coaches
South Florida Bulls men's basketball coaches
Tennessee Tech Golden Eagles men's basketball coaches